Vanessa Goodwin (22 April 1969 – 3 March 2018) was an Australian politician. She was the Liberal Party member for the seat of Pembroke in the Tasmanian Legislative Council from the Pembroke by-election on 1 August 2009 until her resignation due to brain cancer on 2 October 2017.

Early life
Goodwin was born in Hobart, Tasmania. She received a Bachelor of Arts and Bachelor of Laws from the University of Tasmania, a Master of Philosophy (Criminology) from the University of Cambridge, and a Doctor of Philosophy from the University of Tasmania.

Career
Goodwin was a criminologist and lawyer who had worked for the Department of Police and Public Safety. She had previously worked as an Associate to the Chief Justice of the Supreme Court of Tasmania, as the Public Affairs Officer for the local Australian Hotels Association branch and as a research assistant for the Tasmanian Governor.

Goodwin unsuccessfully contested the state seat of Franklin at the 2006 Tasmanian election, and the federal seat of Franklin at the 2007 federal election.

In 2009, Tasmanian Legislative Council member for Pembroke, Allison Ritchie, resigned, causing a by-election. Goodwin stood as the Liberal candidate, and won by a large margin.  She was re-elected in 2013.

After the 2014 Tasmanian election, Goodwin was appointed Attorney-General, Minister for Justice, Minister for Corrections and Minister for the Arts, as well as Leader for the Government in the Legislative Council.

Goodwin resigned on 2 October 2017 due to health reasons. Her seat was filled in a by-election, which was won by Labor's Jo Siejka.

Health and death
On 25 March 2017, Goodwin was hospitalised with multiple brain tumours. On 6 April, Premier Will Hodgman informed the parliament that she was not expected to recover.

She died from brain cancer on 3 March 2018, aged 48, on the day of the 2018 Tasmanian state election.

References

External links
Official website

1969 births
2018 deaths
Politicians from Hobart
Liberal Party of Australia members of the Parliament of Tasmania
Members of the Tasmanian Legislative Council
University of Tasmania alumni
Alumni of the University of Cambridge
Australian criminologists
Australian women criminologists
21st-century Australian politicians
Women members of the Tasmanian Legislative Council
Deaths from brain tumor
Deaths from cancer in Tasmania
Neurological disease deaths in Tasmania
21st-century Australian women politicians